What the Peeper Saw or Night Hair Child is a 1972 thriller film directed by James Kelley and Andrea Bianchi and starring Mark Lester, Britt Ekland, Hardy Krüger and Lilli Palmer.

Plot
Sarah, mother of the 12 year old Marcus, dies mysteriously while taking a bath. Her husband Paul is later remarried to 22 year old Elise. Three months into their marriage, Marcus returns home from boarding school, two weeks before term finals. Elise meets him in the hallway of the house and asks him how he returned home. Marcus replied that he took a thousand pesos from his father's study, prompting Elise into thinking that he stole the money. She later tries to warm up to Marcus and asks him about his early return from school, to which he replies that a chickenpox epidemic broke out there. Elise notices further abnormal behavior from Marcus, who also takes a sexual interest into her.
Days later, Marcus' father Paul returns and him and Elise discuss about the stolen money from Paul's study at a dinner. Marcus now claims that he took three hundred pesos as he didn't have any pesos on him for the taxi ride home. Elise quickly contradicts this and tells Paul about their first encounter where Marcus claimed he took a thousand pesos, but can't present any proof to Paul. Paul lets the matter slide.

Elise, now fully suspicious about Marcus, begins searching his room for the stolen money. She finds the shredded remains of a letter Marcus received from the mail earlier which he claimed to have come from his school book club. She becomes even more suspicious and decides to pay Marcus' school a visit. There, the Principal Dr. Kessler tells her about Marcus' stalking crimes. He even says about the findings of crude sexual drawings in Marcus' dorm in school, which lead into his expulsion. Kessler also tells Elise about Marcus' obsession of torturing and killing animals. A shocked Elise later tells Paul about this, who admits Marcus' mental disorientation after his mother's death. He reassures Elise that Marcus needs more time and love.

However, Elise still struggles to fully accept Marcus into her life. She later discovers Sarah's clothes hidden in the attic. She confronts Marcus about the finding, but Marcus denies putting the clothes there. Elise later asks Marcus how his mother was like, but Marcus accuses Elise of distrust and leaves.
One night Paul takes Elise into a house party, where she feels uneasy among the guests. She then runs into Dr. Viorne in the bathroom, who tells Elise that Sarah, Marcus' mother, had died there. Viorne also tells her that she slipped into the tub and drowned as she suddenly went into a heart attack. A shocked Elise then demands answers from Paul, who reluctantly tells her that the house belonged to them before Sarah died. After her death, Paul sold the house to Viorne and moved to their new home.
Throughout the film, Elise keeps growing more suspicious about Marcus. She keeps telling Paul about his lies and denials about the crimes he committed, but Paul pays no heed. Before Paul's departure to Paris, a drunk Elise keeps taunting Marcus into admitting his crimes, but Marcus mocks her instead. She then tries to reconcile with Paul, but he ignores her and leaves for the airport.

After Paul leaves, Elise lies in bed until she notices a hole in her bedroom ceiling. She runs to the attic where she finds a hole was dug underneath the floorboards so that she and Paul can be spied upon. Elise then rushes up to Marcus' bedroom and demands answers for everything. She then demands the truth about Sarah's death, as she suspected Marcus killed her. Marcus agrees to answer, only if Elise offered herself to him. Elise then reluctantly strips herself nude while asking about Sarah's death. Marcus then admits to the murder to a nude Elise, who can't believe his confessions. She then rebuffs Marcus' claims and storms off the room. Marcus claims that he was not a child, as children could not murder their mothers.

A frantic Elise then calls Paul back from the airport about the hole in the attic. She then takes him there, but finds that hole filled in, presumably by Marcus. Elise pleads Paul to believe her, to which Paul doesn't answer, but also doesn't say anything to Elise. A couple of days later, Paul finds their family dog floating dead in the pool. Marcus later takes the carcass and buries it.

Elise then goes to Dr. Viorne's office, who questions her about all the discoveries and accusations against Marcus. By using reverse psychology in a lengthy inquiry, Viorne makes her doubt her claims as she had no proof. Viorne then demands why Elise stripped nude in front of Marcus, who was a minor. She also accuses Elise of killing the family dog. Elise denies the claims and keeps telling that she was made to strip by Marcus in exchange of his confession, but Viorne doesn't believe her.

Elise, now being accused of sexually assaulting a minor, becomes mentally unstable and decides to kill Marcus in his sleep. When she is about to smother him, Paul interrupts and takes her away. Elise is then taken to a mental asylum, where she is given high sedatives. She then starts having nightmares of her killing Marcus, her getting killed by the family dog unleashed by Marcus, and her having sex with Marcus while Paul watches on. 

Elise is later released from the asylum after her recovery. Paul picks her up from the gates and forgives her of all her misconducts. He also says that he sold the house as he wanted a fresh start with her and Marcus. Marcus then introduces his new dog, Hannibal to Elise. 

Marcus and Elise then take a stroll alone while Marcus proposes her an incestuous affair, citing that Paul was aging and was no longer able to satisfy Elise's desires. Elise then agrees and they both kiss passionately. While walking through the park, they come across a road where Elise notices a car coming up at high speed. She then throws the ball across the road, which the dog Hannibal runs after. Marcus gives chase after him, only to be run over by the car which apparently kills him. Elise then walks away from the scene as a crowd forms around the dead Marcus.

Cast
 Mark Lester as Marcus
 Britt Ekland as Elise
 Hardy Krüger as Paul
 Lilli Palmer as Dr Viorne
 Harry Andrews as Headmaster
 Conchita Montes as Sophie
 Collette Jack as Sarah

Release
What the Peeper Saw was released in Italy on 14 October 1972 and in West Germany on 7 February 1973.

References

External links
 

1972 films
1972 horror films
British horror thriller films
Incest in film
1970s thriller drama films
Films directed by Andrea Bianchi
Films scored by Stelvio Cipriani
Films shot in Almería
1972 drama films
1970s English-language films
1970s British films